ASP is a German gothic rock band from Frankfurt am Main formed in 1999. The name is identical to the pseudonym of the band's leader Asp (Alexander Spreng), and is pronounced as one word (like the snake).

Biography

ASP were formed in 1999 by Alexander Frank Spreng (a.k.a. "Asp") and Matthias Ambré (a.k.a. "Matze"), producing their first 3-track demo CD later that year. The following year saw a record deal with Trisol, who released the band's debut album Hast Du mich vermisst? ("Have you missed me [very much]?"), as well as the band's first live performance, at the 'Gothicworld' festival having added Andreas Gross (a.k.a. "Tossi") on bass, Oliver Himmighoffen (a.k.a. "Himmi") on drums and a choir section to the line-up.

The following three years saw the release of two further albums Duett and Weltunter, which, along with the debut, formed the album series Der Schwarze Schmetterling ("The Black Butterfly"). ASP also became a popular live act over these years, regularly appearing at high-profile festivals.

The band suffered some difficulty in 2004 with the bankruptcy of distributor EFA, though their albums were reissued later that year, along with the Interim Works Compendium, a 2CD collection of ASP rarities as well as selected tracks from their three albums to date. Another string of live dates took them through to the release of Aus der Tiefe in May 2005, the fourth part of the Der Schwarze Schmetterling series.  The fifth part Requiembryo followed in 2007.

The year 2008 saw the release of three new albums. First, a best of-album Horror Vacui was released in February. This was followed by a tour in Europe. At the end of August the band released Zaubererbruder - Der Krabat-Liederzyklus, an album based on the Sorbian Krabat legend (see, e.g., Krabat by Otfried Preußler). The live recording Akoasma is available since December 2008.
They have also remixed Emilie Autumn's "Liar", plus provided vocals for the mix. It is known as the "Manic Depressive Mix" and is featured on Autumn's Liar/Dead Is The New Alive EP.

The band released their first DVD in August 2009, entitled Von Zaubererbrüdern.

In 2011, after almost 11 years of cooperation, the paths of the two founders of the band diverged - songwriter and singer Alexander "Asp" Spreng and producer and guitarist Matthias Ambré. ASP as a band continued with new partners, and the musicians Andreas Gross and Oliver Himmighoffen were retained for live performances. The reasons for separation are given officially as personal and professional differences.

One year later Oliver Himmighoffen also left the band. In his place Stefan Günther, who is a friend of Sören Jordan, joined the band.

Discography

Studio albums

Live albums

Compilations

EPs

Singles

Music videos
2005: "Me"
2011: "Bald Anders"
2015: "Astoria verfallen (Verfallen - Folge 1: Astoria)"
2017: "OdeM (Verfallen, Folge 2: Fassaden)"
2017: "Umrissmann (Verfallen, Folge 2: Fassaden)"
2017: "Abertausend Fragen"
2017: "20.000 Meilen"
2017: "Nehmt Abschied/Auld Lang Syne"
2019: "Die Untiefen"
2019: "Abyssus 2 (Musik)"
2019: "Tintakel"
2021: "Raise Some Hell Now!"
2021: "Echo"
2022: "ENDLICH!"

DVDs
2009: Von Zaubererbrüdern

Box sets
2007: The Once in a Lifetime Recollection (feat. Chamber live; Limited to 1,999 copies)
2011: Der Komplette Schwarze Schmetterling-Zyklus (10-CD box set containing all the songs within the Schwarzer Schmetterling cycle)

References

ASP at Discogs

External links

Official Website

German alternative rock groups
German gothic metal musical groups
German Neue Deutsche Härte music groups
Musical groups from Frankfurt
German gothic rock groups